Katie Edith Gliddon (6 May 1883 – 1 September 1967) was a British watercolour artist and militant suffragette. She was a member of the Women's Social and Political Union (WSPU) for whom she campaigned for which she was imprisoned in Holloway Prison in 1912. Specialising in painting flowers, in her later years she was a teacher of painting and drawing.

Early years

Gliddon was born in Twickenham in Middlesex in 1883, the daughter of Margaret Martha née Lelean (1860–1941) and Aurelius James Louis Gliddon (1857-1929), a minister for the United Reformed Church (1882–1884) and a homeopathist. The 1911 Census lists him as a General Merchant and Investment Broker and Katie Edith as an artist, she having studied at the Slade School of Fine Art from 1900 to 1904 under Frederick Brown and Henry Tonks. Her younger sister Gladys Evelyn Gliddon (1886-1969) was also listed as an artist. Her younger brother Lt. Maurice Gliddon MC (1892–1917) was killed in action during World War I.

Activism

Gliddon joined the Croydon branch of the Women's Social and Political Union (WSPU) in about 1910 at about the same time that her brother Cuthbert Paul Gliddon was acting as an organiser of the Men's Political Union for Women's Enfranchisement. He campaigned under the name 'Charles Gray' to save his parents' embarrassment while Katie Edith went under the pseudonym 'Catherine Susan Gray' for the same reason. By 1911 she had published articles on women's suffrage in several newspapers. The New York-based Davis & Langdale Company lists an ink and brush painting titled ‘Gliddon’ by the artist Walter Sickert from about 1912 which almost certainly portrays Katie Gliddon as she knew Sickert's sister Helena Swanwick, who was also an activist for women's suffrage.<ref>[http://www.davisandlangdale.com/Pages/WalterRichardSickert.html Portrait of 'Gliddon by Walter Sickert - Davis & Langdale Company, Inc]</ref> In addition, both Gliddon and Sickert were members of the New English Art Club.

In March 1912 she smashed the window of a Post Office in Wimpole Street and was arrested and sentenced to two months imprisonment with hard labour in Holloway Prison which she served during March and April 1912. Expecting to be imprisoned for her actions Gliddon had sewn pencils into the collar of her coat and used these to write and illustrate a secret prison diary in the margins of her copy of  The Poetical Works of Percy Bysshe Shelley. Gliddon's sentence of hard labour was sewing and she wrote in her prison diary that she deliberately sewed badly.

Later years
After World War I Gliddon became a successful watercolour artist specialising in painting flowers, exhibiting at the Royal Academy of Arts, the New English Art Club, the Society of Women Artists and the Royal Society of Painters in Water Colours among other galleries.Johnson, Jane & Greutzner, Alan, The Dictionary of British Artists, 1880-1940: British Artists (vol.5), Antique Collectors' Club Ltd, 1980, ; Royal Academy Exhibitors 1905–1970: Royal Academy Exhibitors, 1905-1970: A Dictionary of Artists and Their Work in the Summer Exhibitions of the Royal Academy of Arts, Vol. III (Wakefield: EP Publishing) In 1927 she illustrated French Poetry for Children'' by Archibald Watson Bain. In 1939 she was living in Woking in Surrey where she was listed as a Teacher of Drawing.

After a career as an art teacher she retired to 10 Southey Road in Worthing in West Sussex and died in Worthing in 1967 aged 84. A friend and relative was the fellow-suffragette Helen Margaret Spanton. She never married. Her papers, drawings and original prison diary are in the Women's Library, having been donated by her nephews.

In 2019 the Museum of Croydon held an exhibition to commemorate her life and her link with the town.

References

External links
Pages from the Prison Diary of Katie Edith Gliddon - Google Arts and Culture

1883 births
1967 deaths
20th-century English painters
20th-century English women artists
Alumni of the Slade School of Fine Art
British feminists
British women's rights activists
English suffragettes
English women painters
Holloway brooch recipients
Painters from London
People from Twickenham
Prisoners and detainees of England and Wales
Women's Social and Political Union
Women's suffrage in the United Kingdom